Inhibitor of growth protein 5 is a protein that in humans is encoded by the ING5 gene.

The protein encoded by this gene is similar to ING1, a tumor suppressor protein that can interact with TP53, inhibit cell growth, and induce apoptosis. This protein contains a PHD-finger, which is a common motif in proteins involved in chromatin remodeling. This protein can bind TP53 and EP300/p300, a component of the histone acetyl transferase complex, suggesting its involvement in TP53-dependent regulatory pathway.

Interactions
ING5 has been shown to interact with EP300 and P53.

References

Further reading